Deenbandhu Chhotu Ram University of Science and Technology (DCRUST), formerly Chhotu Ram State College of Engineering, Murthal (CRSCE), is a state university located in Murthal, Sonipat, Haryana, India. It was established in 2006 by an Act of the Government of Haryana, upgrading a 1986 established college.

History 
It was founded in 1986 by the Government of Haryana in memory of Sir Chhotu Ram (1881–1945). It was then known as the Chhotu Ram State College of Engineering, Murthal until the government of Haryana upgraded it to University on 6 November 2006 through an Act 29 of 2006 of the Legislature of the state of Haryana. The university has been considered eligible for grants under Section 12(B) of UGC Act, 1956 in March, 2009

Location 

Departments 
The university has the following departments:

Engineering/science 
 Architecture
 Biomedical
 Biotechnology
 Center of Excellence for Energy and Environment Studies (CEEES)
 Chemical
 Civil
 Computer science
 Electrical
 Electronics and communication
 Mechanical
Education

Management and humanities 
 Humanities
 Management

Sciences and mathematics 
 Chemistry 
 Mathematics
 Physics
 Environmental science

Hostels
The university campus has a total of 7 hostels, three for women and 4 for men. The capacity of the women's hostels is 450; the men's hostels, 966.

Foreign collaborations 
The university is a member of Association of Commonwealth Universities (ACU).

See also
List of universities in India

References

External links 

 Official website

Engineering colleges in Haryana
Deenbandhu Chhotu Ram University of Science and Technology
Sonipat district
Science and technology in Haryana
Educational institutions established in 1986
1986 establishments in India